Janette Heather McBride, known professionally as Janet McBride (born 6 November 1983 in Queensland, Australia), is a Filipino-Australian former actress and television host.

Early life
Born in Queensland, Australia, Janette Heather McBride is the daughter of Leslie and Fe McBride. Her parents were penpals, her mother is from Borongan, Samar and her father is from Queensland, and is of Scottish-Irish descent. She has one younger brother and four half-siblings from her mother's previous marriage.

Career
McBride was part of ABS-CBN's Star Circle Batch 8 and appeared in Richard Loves Lucy, Kaybol: Ang Bagong TV and ASAP.

Her breakthrough performance in Philippine cinema came in 2000 when she was cast in Laurice Guillen's award-winning and critically acclaimed film Tanging Yaman which won her a New Movie Actress of the Year award in the PMPC Star Awards in 2001. The same year, she starred in Star Drama Theater Presents: Rave with Marvin Agustin, with whom she previously worked in the film Tanging Yaman.

McBride was one of the hosts of ABS-CBN's Talk TV, which replaced Today with Kris Aquino in 2001.

In 2006, McBride returned to the Philippines and appeared in Makita Ka Lang Muli.

Personal life
McBride was in an eight-year on and off relationship with Mo Twister. McBride's then blossoming entertainment career was cut short when the couple moved to the United States in the early 2000s, where McBride worked at  odd jobs as a call center agent, a photographer and in customer care.

In September 2013, McBride married Bens Omaga, who she met in a church retreat in 2011.

McBride is close friends with her Talk TV co-hosts Julius Babao, Christine Bersola-Babao and Ryan Agoncillo. Babao was a wedding sponsor at McBride's wedding while McBride was part of the wedding entourage of the Babaos' wedding in 2003.

McBride is a member of the Victory Christian Fellowship.

Filmography

Television

Film

Awards and nominations

Notes

References

External links

1983 births
Australian television actresses
Australian child actresses
Australian people of Filipino descent
Australian people of Irish descent
Australian emigrants to the Philippines
Living people
People from Queensland
Star Magic
Australian actresses of Asian descent